Oscar Gonzales is an Argentine table tennis player who played in the 2004 Summer Olympics with Pablo Tabachnik.

References

See also 
 Table Tennis at the 2004 Summer Olympics

Year of birth missing (living people)
Argentine male table tennis players
Olympic table tennis players of Argentina
Table tennis players at the 2004 Summer Olympics
Living people
Place of birth missing (living people)
South American Games bronze medalists for Argentina
South American Games medalists in table tennis
Competitors at the 2006 South American Games
21st-century Argentine people